In physics, a wavefront is the locus (a line, or, in a wave propagating in 3 dimensions, a surface) of points having the same phase. 

Wavefront may also refer to:
 Wave front set, WF(f), a mathematical set in the field of microlocal analysis that characterizes the singularities of a generalized function  in space and with respect to its Fourier transform at each point
 Wavefront arbiter, a circuit used to make decisions which control the crossbar of a high capacity switch fabric in parallel.
 Wavefront coding, a method for increasing the depth of field in an image to produce sharper images
 Wavefront Technologies, a computer graphics company that developed and sold animation software used in Hollywood motion pictures and other industries
 Wavefront .obj file A 3D mesh format
 Wavefront Technology Solutions Inc., an improved injection company for the petroleum and environmental sectors